Thorn, also known as Flatwoods, is an unincorporated community in Chickasaw County, Mississippi, United States.

History
Thorn is named for the first postmaster, William Thorn. A post office operated under the name Thorn from 1892 to 1971.

Thorn was once home to a school and general store.

References

Unincorporated communities in Chickasaw County, Mississippi
Unincorporated communities in Mississippi